Hypserpa laurina is a slender twining climber in the plant family Menispermaceae. It is native to New Guinea and north eastern Queensland in Australia.

Description
It has pendulous branches and the leaves are alternate, 3-veined, elliptic, and measure up to 

Flowers are pale yellow in colour, male flowers measure about  diameter, female flowers about  diameter.

The fruit is a red globular drupe measuring about

Phenology
Flowering occurs from July to February, fruits ripen from November to April.

Taxonomy
The basionym Selwynia laurina was first described by the German-born Australian botanist Ferdinand von Mueller in his work Fragmenta Phytographiae Australiae in 1864. The German botanist Ludwig Diels reviewed the genus and gave this taxon the new combination Hypserpa laurina, which was published in Adolf Engler's work Das Pflanzenreich: Regni vegetabilis conspectus in 1910.

Distribution and habitat
Hypserpa laurina grows in rainforest on the east coast of northern Australia, from Airlie Beach in north Queensland, northwards to Cape York Peninsula and then to New Guinea.

Ecology
Fruits of the laurel-leaf hypserpa are eaten by cassowaries and fruit pigeons.

Conservation
This species is listed by the Queensland Department of Environment and Science as least concern. , it has not been assessed by the IUCN.

Gallery

References

External links
 
 
 View a map of historical sightings of this species at the Australasian Virtual Herbarium
 View observations of this species on iNaturalist
 View images of this species on Flickriver

Flora of New Guinea
Flora of Queensland
Taxa named by Ludwig Diels
Taxa described in 1910
Hypserpa